Paul Lusk (born November 14, 1971) is an American men's basketball coach and former point guard, who is a current assistant men's basketball coach for the Purdue Boilermakers. He played college basketball at Iowa from 1991 to 1993 before transferring to Southern Illinois where he played from 1993 to 1995 for head coach Rich Herrin. He then served as the head coach of the Missouri State Bears (2011–2018).

Playing career
A native of New Baden, Illinois, Lusk played high school basketball at Trenton (Wesclin) high school, leading the Warriors to the 1990 Class A state title with an 83–78, 2OT win over top-ranked Fairbury (Prairie Central).  Lusk originally committed to the University of Iowa, but suffered a broken leg in his freshman year with the Hawkeyes and later transferred to Southern Illinois University where he played under longtime head coach Rich Herrin.

Coaching career

Purdue
Lusk was an assistant at Purdue University from 2004 to 2011 under legendary coach Gene Keady and Matt Painter.

Missouri State
Lusk was introduced as the new coach at Missouri State University on Friday, April 1, 2011, replacing longtime friend, Cuonzo Martin after he left for the head coaching position at Tennessee. In his first season as a head coach, the Bears entered the year with strong expectations and returned Missouri Valley Player of the Year, Kyle Weems. The team would go on to hold a 15–16 record. A major highlight of the season was a road victory over 21st-ranked Creighton in the opening game of conference play.

In Lusk's second season as head coach, with a roster including six freshmen and only one returning senior, the Bears were the youngest team in the Missouri Valley Conference and one of the youngest in the nation. Struggling early in the season the Bears went 0–10 against Division I programs, only gaining 2 wins in their first 12 games against Division II teams. The Bears registered their first win over a Division I team on December 30, beating Southern Illinois University 70–59.

He was fired from Missouri State on March 3, 2018.

Creighton
Following his firing from Missouri State, Lusk joined the coaching staff of Greg McDermott at Creighton.

Return to Purdue
On April 12, 2021, Lusk returned to Painter's staff at Purdue.

Head coaching record

References

1971 births
Living people
American men's basketball coaches
American men's basketball players
Basketball coaches from Illinois
Basketball players from Illinois
College men's basketball head coaches in the United States
Creighton Bluejays men's basketball coaches
Dubuque Spartans men's basketball coaches
Missouri State Bears basketball coaches
People from Clinton County, Illinois
People from St. Clair County, Illinois
Purdue Boilermakers men's basketball coaches
Southern Illinois Salukis men's basketball coaches
Southern Illinois Salukis men's basketball players
Sportspeople from Greater St. Louis